George Higgins was a Scottish amateur footballer who played in the Scottish League for Queen's Park as a centre half.

Personal life 
Higgins rose to the rank of lieutenant in the Royal Scots Fusiliers during the First World War. While holding the rank of second lieutenant, he was shot in the hand in 1915.

Career statistics

References

1880 births
Scottish footballers
Scottish Football League players
British Army personnel of World War I
Association football wing halves
Queen's Park F.C. players
Association football fullbacks
Royal Scots Fusiliers officers
Date of death missing
Footballers from North Ayrshire
Scottish military personnel
People from Beith